Magomed Magomedbasarovich Abidinov (born 3 February 1989) is a Russian footballer.

Career
Abidinov made his professional debut for Anzhi Makhachkala on 14 July 2010 in the Russian Cup game against FC Pskov-747.

External links

1989 births
People from Karabudakhkentsky District
Living people
Russian footballers
Association football defenders
FC Anzhi Makhachkala players
PFC Spartak Nalchik players
FC Ararat Yerevan players
Russian expatriate footballers
Expatriate footballers in Armenia
Armenian Premier League players
FC Mashuk-KMV Pyatigorsk players
Sportspeople from Dagestan